Radishchev is an urban locality (a work settlement) in Nizhneilimsky District of Irkutsk Oblast, Russia. Population:

References

Urban-type settlements in Irkutsk Oblast